Laws against child sexual abuse vary by country based on the local definition of who a child is and what constitutes child sexual abuse. Most countries in the world employ some form of age of consent, with sexual contact with an underage person being criminally penalized. As the age of consent to sexual behaviour varies from country to country, so too do definitions of child sexual abuse. An adult's sexual intercourse with a minor below the legal age of consent may sometimes be referred to as statutory rape, based on the principle that any apparent consent by a minor could not be considered legal consent.

The United Nations Convention on the Rights of the Child (CRC) is an international treaty that legally obligates nations to protect children's rights. Articles 34 and 35 of the CRC require states to protect children from all forms of sexual exploitation and sexual abuse. This includes outlawing the coercion of a child to perform sexual activity, the prostitution of children, and the exploitation of children in creating pornography. States are also required to prevent the abduction, sale, or trafficking of children. As of January 23, 2015, 196 countries have ratified the Convention, including every member of the United Nations except the United States.

Fiji
Fiji has recently updated its legislative standards with the introduction of the Crimes Decree (2009). This removed gendered limitations that the Penal Code had held regarding victims and offenders. It updated the maximum sentence so that any offender can face a sentence of life imprisonment for the sexual assault of a person under the age of 13. Prior to this, female offenders could only receive a maximum sentence of up to seven years imprisonment. As well as this, it included the offence of penile-anal penetration, though it does still use the degrading terminology of "sodomy". Previously, the Penal Code only considered penile-vaginal penetration. There are still limitations in Fiji regarding child sexual assault, particularly in the criminal justice practices. The use of mediation between offender, victim and the surrounding families has great potential to revictimise and retraumatise the victim.

India

The Protection of Children Against Sexual Offences Act, 2012 regarding child sexual abuse has been passed by both the houses of the Indian Parliament in May 2012. The Act came into force from 14 November 2012.

Malaysia
Few forms of child abuse are a crime under Malaysian law. Suspects can be charged only for rape (penile penetration) and incest.
Police can do little since the legal definition is limited. Malaysian courts seldom convict people for child sexual abuse, and Malaysia keeps no official statistics on child abuse.

South Africa
The South African law on sexual offences was codified in the Criminal Law (Sexual Offences and Related Matters) Amendment Act, 2007. Chapter 3 of the act deals with sexual offences against children. The act criminalises:
 acts of sexual penetration with a child (statutory rape)
 other sexual acts with a child (statutory sexual assault)
 exploitation of children in prostitution
 sexual grooming of children
 showing pornography to children
 using children in child pornography
 compelling children to witness sexual acts
 indecent exposure to children
The act establishes a National Register for Sex Offenders which lists people convicted of sexual offences against children and the mentally disabled.

Turkey
Turkey's constitutional court decided in 2016 to annul the provision that punishes all sexual acts against children under the age of 15 as sexual abuse, according to opposition media. According to the government, they are preparing a new law more efficient against child abuse and the prohibition is still in place.

United Kingdom
The United Kingdom rewrote its criminal code in the Sexual Offences Act of 2003. This Act includes definitions and penalties for child sexual abuse offences, and (so far as relating to offences) applies to England and Wales and Northern Ireland. The Scottish Law Commission published its review of rape and sexual offences in December 2007, which includes a similar consolidation and codification of child sexual abuse offences in Scotland.

United States

Child sexual abuse has been recognized specifically as a type of child maltreatment in U.S. federal law since the initial Congressional hearings on child sex in 1973. Child sexual abuse is illegal in every state, as well as under federal law. Among the states, the specifics of child sexual abuse laws vary, but certain features of these laws are common to all states.

Yemen
In Yemen, the law does not define child abuse.

Zambia
A recent June 30, 2008 landmark decision by judge, Philip Musonda, of the Zambian High Court gave a minor girl-student 45 million Zambian Kwacha in awards after she brought her teacher to court for statutory rape. This is the first case of its kind for a minor to win against a person of authority in the nation of Zambia.

References

Child sexual abuse
Sex and the law

id:Undang-undang tentang pelecehan seksual terhadap anak